Chin mosque is a historical mosque of the XIV century. It is a part of Old City and located on Kichik Gala street, near Palace of the Shirvanshahs, in the city of Baku, in Azerbaijan. The building was also registered as a national architectural monument by the decision of the Cabinet of Ministers of the Republic of Azerbaijan dated August 2, 2001, No. 132.

History
According to the epigraphic inscription on facade, on top of the entrance door, the mosque was built in 1375 (Hijri 777). It is also noted that, the mosque was constructed by the will of Fazlullah Imam ibn Osman Shirvani. For this reason, sometimes the mosque is called by his name.

It gets clear from the other epigraphic writing on the facade that the monument was restored in 1772-1773 (Hijri 1186) by Masood Ali.

In 2012, substantial repair and restoration works were held on the museum by Old City State Historical-Architectural Reserve Department.

Architectural features

Stalactic mihrab, which consists of five tiers framed with a rectangle on the southern wall of the interior, forms certain motifs of Shirvan-Absheron architectural school as a whole.  At edges small niches are placed.
 
The main facade of the mosque is asymmetrical and its rigid, voluminous composition is emphasized with classic-type portal-entrance. 
 
Accurately profiled rectangular frame of the portal, profiled cavity and epigraphic heading of Arabic are represented in classic form, in the background of the entire wall of the facade. Among eastern style portals of middle ages of the city, the portal of this mosque is the most classic.

Exposition
Ancient coins and coins are exhibited and preserved in the mosque. The main exposition of the museum is currency units and coins and other interesting ancient exhibits from the era of the Sasanids, Safavids, Shirvanshahs and others, which existed in various periods since the beginning of money circulation in Azerbaijan. The exhibits are divided into separate periods and grouped in various showcases. The general features of the period, specifications, types and information about the location of currency units of that period are placed on a separate board outside the showcases.

Gallery

See also
Old City

References

Monuments and memorials in Azerbaijan
Mosques in Baku
Museums in Azerbaijan